Monte Potrero is a village and municipality in Catamarca Province in northwestern Argentina.

It is about 5 km away from La Merced.

The population was 196 as of the 2001 census in the area, an increase of 3.15% from the previous 190 inhabitants.

References

Populated places in Catamarca Province